Roland Ducke (19 November 1934, in Benešov nad Ploučnicí (Bensen), Czechoslovakia – 26 June 2005, in Jena, Germany) was a German football player. His younger brother Peter was also a successful footballer.

Ducke played almost whole his career for FC Carl Zeiss Jena.

On the national level he played for East Germany national team, Ducke played for this side from 1958 to 1967.

In 1970, he won the award for the GDR Footballer of the Year.

Ducke died on 26 June 2005 of prostate cancer.

References

External links
 
 
 

1934 births
2005 deaths
People from Benešov nad Ploučnicí
German footballers
East German footballers
Sudeten German people
FC Carl Zeiss Jena players
East Germany international footballers
Deaths from prostate cancer
Naturalized citizens of Germany
DDR-Oberliga players
Association football wingers